Aziza Sbaity (born 17 November 1991) is a Lebanese sprinter. She is the 100m Lebanese national record holder and she has represented  her country at one outdoor and two indoor World Championships.

Competition record

Personal bests
Outdoor
100 meters – 11.68 (0.0 m/s, Tunis 2021)
200 meters – 23.77 (+1.5 m/s, Montpellier 2021)

Indoor
60 meters – 7.51 (Marseille 2020)
200 meters – 24.43 (Istanbul 2021)

References

External links
 

1991 births
Living people
Lebanese female sprinters
Place of birth missing (living people)
World Athletics Championships athletes for Lebanon
Athletes (track and field) at the 2018 Asian Games
Asian Games competitors for Lebanon